"Wrapped Around Your Finger" is the second UK single (and fourth US single) from the Police's 1983 album Synchronicity. Written by Sting, it was released worldwide by A&M Records and featured the non-album track "Someone to Talk To" as a B-side in the UK, while a live version of "Tea in the Sahara" was the US B-side.

Background
Like other tracks on Synchronicity, such as "Every Breath You Take" and "King of Pain," "Wrapped Around Your Finger" was a personal song for Sting. He said in an interview, Every Breath You Take', 'Wrapped Around Your Finger' were all about my life."

Sting described "Wrapped Around Your Finger" as "a spiteful song about turning the tables on someone who had been in charge." Like other Police songs from this period, it features mythological and literary references, including the Scylla and Charybdis monsters of Greek mythology, and the German legend of Faust. It has a relatively slow, almost foreboding feel in the beginning verses, modulating to evoke a lighter, triumphant feel during the chorus.

"Wrapped Around Your Finger" was released as the follow-up to the worldwide hit "Every Breath You Take." In Britain, it reached No. 7 on the UK Singles Chart in August 1983, and in the US, it was instead released as the fourth single from Synchronicity (after "Every Breath You Take," "King of Pain," and "Synchronicity II"). The single reached No. 8 on the Billboard chart in March 1984.

The British picture sleeve for "Wrapped Around Your Finger" was released in three colour variations: blue, red, and yellow. The single was also released on a picture disc, each featuring the face of Sting, Andy Summers, or Stewart Copeland. Out of the twelve thousand copies released, however, ten thousand had Sting's face on it, while Summers and Copeland appeared on one thousand each (making the latter two variations somewhat rare.)

The B-side of the song in Britain, "Someone to Talk To," was written by guitarist Andy Summers. Sting refused to provide vocals, leaving Summers to sing. Summers expressed disappointment at this, saying, "Maybe I had just split up from my wife. It was a nice thing I had on the guitar and I was disappointed that Sting wouldn't sing it. That would have given it more of an official stamp." Drummer Stewart Copeland said of this conflict, "Andy did his best on vocals but I too was disappointed that Sting didn't sing it. He was very touchy about lyrics." The American B-side, "Tea in the Sahara" (live), comes from the Synchronicity Tour.

Music video
The music video, directed by Godley & Creme (who directed the videos for "Every Breath You Take" and "Synchronicity II"), furthers the ethereal feeling the song gives off, by having footage of the band performing in a candle-lit, gloomy room, interspersed with scenes of Sting running among tall candlesticks arranged in a sort of maze. Andy Summers is shown playing an acoustic guitar, an instrument not used in any of the Police's recordings.

The music on the recording of the video was played fast and the "singing" was mimed fast. When the music was slowed down to normal speed, the members of the band appear to be moving in slow motion. Drummer Stewart Copeland claimed that he used a similar method for a solo video (performing under the alias of "Klark Kent"), only he "had the music run slowly, so that [he] mimed in slow motion, and then when they synched it up to the music, [he] had this herky-jerky, kinda 'fast-mo' movement, that was still in time with the music, only it was sort of jerky and strange body movements."

Sting praised the video, saying:

Andy Summers, however, was critical of Sting's overacting in the video.

In a promotional video tied in with the release of The Muppets Take Manhattan, "I'm Gonna Always Love You" from the movie featured lead vocals by Miss Piggy and had her imitating parts of the "candle labyrinth" from the Police video.

Reception
In a positive retrospective review of the song, AllMusic journalist Steve Huey described "Wrapped Around Your Finger" as "a complex take on power dynamics in relationships." He suggested that "the complexity of its jumpy rhythms mirrors that of its emotional psychology."  AllMusic colleague Stephen Thomas Erlewine described the song as "a devilishly infectious new wave single."  Ultimate Classic Rock critic Mike Duquette called it the Police's 14th greatest song, saying that by now "Sting could stuff Greek myths and references to Faust in his acid-tongued songs and let the sales roll in."

Track listing

7-inch single: A&M UK (AM 127)
 "Wrapped Around Your Finger" – 5:07
 "Someone to Talk To" – 3:08
 also released on picture disc (AMP127). One per member.

7-inch single: A&M US (AM-2614)
 "Wrapped Around Your Finger" – 5:07
 "Tea in the Sahara (live)" – 5:03

12-inch single: A&M UK (AMX 127)
 "Wrapped Around Your Finger" – 5:07
 "Someone to Talk To" – 3:08
 "Message in a Bottle" (live) – 4:52
 "I Burn for You" – 4:50

12-inch single: A&M US promo (SP17264)
 "Wrapped Around Your Finger" – 5:07
 "Wrapped Around Your Finger" (live) – 5:21
 "Murder by Numbers" – 4:37
 "Someone to Talk To" – 3:08

Personnel
Sting – bass guitar, keyboards, lead and backing vocals
Andy Summers – guitar, effects
Stewart Copeland – drums, percussion

Charts

References

 Wrapped Around Your Finger – technical notes on the music video from director Daniel Pearl.

External links
 

The Police songs
1983 singles
1984 singles
Music videos directed by Godley and Creme
Songs written by Sting (musician)
Song recordings produced by Hugh Padgham
1983 songs
A&M Records singles
Underoath songs